Marsha Thornton (born October 22, 1964 in Killen, Alabama) is a female country music singer. Between 1990 and 2003, she released three studio albums, with her first two released on MCA Records; she has also issued four singles on the Hot Country Songs charts. Her highest peaking single was "A Bottle of Wine and Patsy Cline", written by Lindy Gravelle, which reached No. 59 in 1990.

Discography

Albums

Singles

Notes:
A "The Grass Is Greener" did not chart on Hot Country Songs, but peaked at No. 4 on Hot Country Radio Breakouts.

Music videos

References

1964 births
People from Killen, Alabama
American women country singers
American country singer-songwriters
Living people
Singer-songwriters from Texas
Country musicians from Texas
Country musicians from Alabama
21st-century American women
Singer-songwriters from Alabama